In the geologic timescale, the Olenekian is an age in the Early Triassic epoch; in chronostratigraphy, it is a stage in the Lower Triassic series. It spans the time between  Ma and  Ma (million years ago). The Olenekian is sometimes divided into the Smithian and the Spathian subages or substages. The Olenekian follows the Induan and is followed by the Anisian (Middle Triassic).

The Olenekian saw the deposition of a large part of the Buntsandstein in Europe. The Olenekian is roughly coeval with the regional Yongningzhenian Stage used in China.

Stratigraphic definitions
The Olenekian Stage was introduced into scientific literature by Russian stratigraphers in 1956. The stage is named after Olenëk in Siberia. Before the subdivision in Olenekian and Induan became established, both stages formed the Scythian Stage, which has since disappeared from the official timescale.

The base of the Olenekian is at the lowest occurrence of the ammonoids Hedenstroemia or Meekoceras gracilitatis, and of the conodont Neospathodus waageni. It is defined as ending near the lowest occurrences of genera Japonites, Paradanubites, and Paracrochordiceras; and of the conodont Chiosella timorensis. A GSSP (global reference profile for the base) has not been established as of December 2020.

Olenekian life 

Life was still recovering from the severe end-Permian mass extinction. During the Olenekian, the flora changed from lycopod dominated (e.g. Pleuromeia) to gymnosperm and pteridophyte dominated. These vegetation changes are due to global changes in temperature and precipitation. Conifers (gymnosperms) were the dominant plants during most of the Mesozoic. Among land vertebrates, the archosaurs - a group of diapsid reptiles encompassing crocodiles, pterosaurs, dinosaurs, and ultimately birds - first evolved from archosauriform ancestors during the Olenekian. This group includes ferocious predators like Erythrosuchus.

In the oceans, microbial reefs were common during the Early Triassic, possibly due to lack of competition with metazoan reef builders as a result of the extinction. However, transient metazoan reefs reoccurred during the Olenekian wherever permitted by environmental conditions. Ammonoids and conodonts diversified, but both suffered losses during the Smithian-Spathian boundary extinction at the end of the Smithian subage.

Ray-finned fishes largely remained unaffected by the Permian-Triassic extinction event. Many genera show a cosmopolitan (worldwide) distribution during the Induan and Olenekian (e.g. Australosomus, Birgeria, Parasemionotidae, Pteronisculus, Ptycholepidae, Saurichthys). This is well exemplified in the Griesbachian (early Induan) aged fish assemblages of the Wordie Creek Formation (East Greenland), the Dienerian (late Induan) aged assemblages of the Sakamena Formation (Madagascar), Candelaria Formation (Nevada, United States), and Mikin Formation (Himachal Pradesh, India), and the Smithian aged assemblages of the Vikinghøgda Formation (Spitsbergen, Norway), Thaynes Formation (western United States), and Helongshan Formation (Anhui, China). Ray-finned fishes diversified during the Triassic and reached peak diversity during the Middle Triassic. This diversification is, however, obscured by a taphonomic megabias during the late Olenekian and early middle Anisian.

Marine temnospondyl amphibians, such as the superficially crocodile-shaped trematosaurids Aphaneramma and Wantzosaurus, show wide geographic ranges during the Induan and Olenekian ages. Their fossils are found in Greenland, Spitsbergen, Pakistan and Madagascar. Others, such as Trematosaurus, inhabited freshwater environments and were less widespread.

The first marine reptiles appeared during the Olenekian. Hupehsuchia, Ichthyopterygia and Sauropterygia are among the first marine reptiles to enter the scene (e.g. Cartorhynchus, Chaohusaurus, Utatsusaurus, Hupehsuchus, Grippia, Omphalosaurus, Corosaurus). Sauropterygians and ichthyosaurs ruled the oceans during the Mesozoic Era.

An example of an exceptionally diverse Early Triassic assemblage is the Paris Biota, fossils of which were discovered near Paris, Idaho and other nearby sites in Idaho and Nevada. The Paris Biota was deposited in the wake of the SSBM and it features at least 7 phyla and 20 distinct metazoan orders, including leptomitid protomonaxonid sponges (previously only known from the Paleozoic), thylacocephalans, crustaceans, nautiloids, ammonoids, coleoids, ophiuroids, crinoids, and vertebrates. Such diverse assemblages show that organisms diversified wherever and whenever climatic an environmental conditions ameliorated.

Smithian–Spathian boundary event 

An important extinction event occurred during the Olenekian age of the Early Triassic, near the Smithian and Spathian subage boundary. The main victims of this Smithian–Spathian boundary event, often called the Smithian–Spathian extinction, were 'disaster taxa': Palaeozoic species that survived the Permian–Triassic extinction event and flourished in the immediate aftermath of the extinction; ammonoids, conodonts, and radiolarians in particular suffered drastic biodiversity losses. Marine reptiles, such as ichthyopterygians and sauropterygians, diversified after the extinction.

The flora was also affected significantly. It changed from lycopod dominated (e.g. Pleuromeia) during the Dienerian and Smithian subages to gymnosperm and pteridophyte dominated in the Spathian. These vegetation changes are due to global changes in temperature and precipitation. Conifers (gymnosperms) were the dominant plants during most of the Mesozoic. Until recently the existence of this extinction event about 249.4 Ma ago was not recognised.

The Smithian–Spathian boundary extinction was linked to late eruptions of the Siberian Traps, which released warming greenhouse gases, resulting in climate change and in acidification, both on land and in the ocean. A large spike in mercury concentrations relative to total organic carbon, much like during the Permian-Triassic extinction, has been suggested as another contributor to the extinction, although this is controversial and has been disputed by other research that suggests elevated mercury levels already existed by the middle Spathian. Prior to the SSBM extinction event, a flat gradient of latitudinal species richness is observed, suggesting that warmer temperatures extended into higher latitudes, allowing extension of geographic ranges of species adapted to warmer temperatures, and displacement or extinctions of species adapted to cooler temperatures. The extinction itself occurred during a subsequent drop in global temperatures (ca. 8°C over a geologically short period) in the latest Smithian; however, temperature alone cannot account for the Smithian-Spathian boundary extinction, because several factors were at play. An alternative explanation for the extinction event hypothesises the biotic crisis took place not at the Smithian-Spathian boundary but shortly before, during the Late Smithian Thermal Maximum (LSTM), with the Smithian-Spathian boundary itself being associated with cessation of intrusive magmatic activity of the Siberian Traps, along with significant global cooling, after which a gradual biotic recovery took place over the early and middle Spathian, along with a decline in continental weathering and a rejuvenation of ocean circulation.

In the ocean, many large and mobile species moved away from the tropics, but large fish remained, and amongst the immobile species such as molluscs, only the ones that could cope with the heat survived; half the bivalves disappeared. Conodonts decreased in average size as a result of the extinction. On land, the tropics were nearly devoid of life, with exceptionally arid conditions recorded in Iberia and other parts of Europe then at low latitude. Many big, active animals returned to the tropics, and plants recolonised on land, only when temperatures returned to normal.

There is evidence that life had recovered rapidly, at least locally. This is indicated by sites that show exceptionally high biodiversity (e.g. the earliest Spathian Paris Biota), which suggest that food webs were complex and comprised several trophic levels.

Notable formations 

 Middle Buntsandstein (Germany)
 Cynognathus Assemblage Zone / Burgersdorp Formation (subzones A-B)* (South Africa)
 Lower Ermaying Formation* (Shaanxi and Shanxi, China)
 Upper Fremouw Formation* (Antarctica)
 Jialingjiang Formation (South China)
 Moenkopi Formation (Torrey and Wutapki members)* (SW USA)
 Nanlinghu Formation (Anhui, China)
 Rybinskian Gorizont* (Russia)
 Sanga do Cabral Formation* (Rio Grande do Sul, Brazil)
 Sludkian Gorizont* (Russia)
 Sulphur Mountain Formation (British Columbia, Canada)
 Ustmylian Gorizont* (Russia)
 Vikinghøgda Formation (Svalbard, Norway)
 Yarenskian Gorizont* (Russia)

* Tentatively assigned to the Olenekian; age estimated primarily via terrestrial tetrapod biostratigraphy (see Triassic land vertebrate faunachrons)

References

Notes

Literature

; 2004: A Geologic Time Scale 2004, Cambridge University Press.
; 1956: Расчленение нижнего отдела триасовой системы на ярусы (Subdivision of the lower series of the Triassic System into stages), Doklady Akademii Nauk SSSR 109(4), pp 842–845 .

External links
GeoWhen Database - Olenekian
Lower Triassic timescale at the website of the subcommission for stratigraphic information of the ICS
Lower Triassic timescale at the website of Norges Network of offshore records of geology and stratigraphy.

 
02
Geological ages
Triassic geochronology
Geology of Siberia
Olenyok basin